Aisin Gioro Yuntao (18 January 1686 - 1 September 1763) was a Qing dynasty imperial prince and the 12th son of the Kangxi Emperor. Yuntao was rather a crony of the Yongzheng Emperor and his adoptive brother, which helped him persist in the succession war. He became the first bearer of the Prince Lü of the First Rank title.

Life 
Yuntao was born on 18 January 1686 to Concubine Ding, Wanlioha Niuniu (完琉哈•妞妞). In his childhood, he was taught by Sumalagu, a confidant of Empress Dowager Xiaozhuang. In 1695, Yuntao was awarded a yellow riding jacket for his excel in martial arts  Yunzhi once recalled that Yuntao addressed Sumalagu as Azhagu (阿扎姑，meaning "careful" in Manchu language). When Sumalagu fell critically ill in 1705, Yuntao personally took care of her. In 1709, Yuntao was granted a title of the prince of the fourth rank for his merits. After Kangxi Emperor's death, Yuntao controlled Bordered Yellow Banner, in contradiction to the earlier records claiming his control over the Plain White Banner. Yuntao did not interfere in the succession war between his brothers, which affected his future. In 1722, Yuntao was made a first bearer of the Prince Lü of the Second Rank title. In 1723, the prince was demoted back to beizi and further downgraded to the grace defender duke for several delicts. In 1730, Yuntao was restored to the prince of the second rank. In 1735, Qianlong Emperor promoted him to Prince of the First Rank and tasked with overseeing the compilation of the imperial genealogy. In 1750, when Yuntao's heir presumptive died, his mother felt aggrieved and was later comforted by step grandson, Hongli. In 1757, Yuntao took Consort Dowager Ding to his manor for recuperation. Lady Wanlioha died at the age of 96 there, becoming the longest living imperial consort in the history of Qing. Yuntao died on 1 September 1763 and was posthumously honoured as Prince Lüyi of the First Rank (履懿亲王， meaning "implementing in a righteous way").

Family 
Primary Consort

 Imperial Princess Consort Luyi, of the Fuca clan (履懿亲王福晋 富察氏)
 Second son (4 August 1706 – 15 May 1707)
 Hongshi (2 August 1707 – 12 October 1710), third son

Secondary Consort

 Secondary consort, of the Fanggiya clan (侧福晋 方佳氏)
 Fourth son (21 January 1729 – 30 April 1731)
 Princess of the Third Rank (郡主, 21 August 1736 – 18 May 1825), fourth daughter
 Married Mingliang of the Fuca clan in 1753  and had issue (one daughter)
 Shizi Hongkun (27 October 1739 – 26 April 1750), fifth son
 Sixth daughter (26 July 1741 – 17 January 1744)
 Sixth son (2 June 1742 – 1742)

 Secondary consort, of the Gūwalgiya clan 
 Third daughter (22 February 1728)

Concubine

 Mistress, of the Ligiya clan
 Princess of the Third Rank (郡主, 30 November 1703 – 19 March 1767), first daughter
 Married Da'ermadadou of the Khorchin Borjigin clan in 1721

 Mistress, of the Mai clan
 Mistress, of the Wanggiya clan
 Lady of the Third Rank (乡君, 18 February 1740 – 8 March 1797), fifth daughter
 Married Gunqilaxi of the Borjigin clan in 1756

 Mistress, of the Chen clan
 Mistress, of the Yao clan
 First son (24 March 1703 – 30 March 1703)

 Mistress, of the Li clan
 Second daughter (8 July 1723 – July 1723)

References 

Qing dynasty imperial princes
Kangxi Emperor's sons
Prince Lü
1686 births
1763 deaths